Wiesław Stefan Kuc (born 2 September 1949 in Sokołów Podlaski) is a Polish politician and
Member of the European Parliament (MEP) for LU,
is the economist and agriculture expert of EP delegation of
Self-Defense
and sits on the European Parliament's Committee on Budgets.

Initially, he was a non-attached like the other members of his party,
but on 1 December 2004, he joined

the Socialist Group together with Bogdan Golik.  He rejoined his Samoobrona colleagues in the Union for Europe of the Nations group in December 2006, leaving Golik alone with the Socialists.

Kuc is a substitute for the Committee on Agriculture and Rural Development and a member of the Delegation to the EU-Bulgaria Joint Parliamentary Committee.

Biography
 Master of Engineering specialising in agricultural consultancy from the Warsaw Agricultural University, Department of Agriculture
 1973: Started working at the Institute of Applied Mathematics and Statistics at the Warsaw Agricultural University
 Whilst working as a teacher, completed a year's educational training at Goshen College, Indiana, U.S.
 1978-1984: head specialist in the National Association of Agricultural Circles and Organisations
 Until 1986, he worked at the Bureau for Youth Affairs of the Cabinet Office
 Department director at the Patent Office, taking up a similar position at the Export Development Bank S.A in 1988.
 From 1991 to 1997, he worked in the Bank Handlowo-Kredytowy, Merkury Bank S.A., Prosper Bank, Bank Staropolski S.A and the KIB Bank in the Ukraine.
 Set up own business in 1997
 Chairman of the board of ESBEO Sp. z o.o and Wisla Consulting Sp. z o.o
 2003: President of the Bialski Furniture Company S.A
 Gained varied professional experience abroad in fields such as agriculture, banking, human resources management in: USA, the Netherlands, Turkey, Austria, Denmark, Hungary, Ukraine, Bulgaria, United Kingdom.

See also
 2004 European Parliament election in Poland

External links
 European Parliament biography
 

1949 births
Living people
Self-Defence of the Republic of Poland MEPs
MEPs for Poland 2004–2009